The action of August 1702 was an inconclusive naval battle that took place from 19 to 25 August 1702 O.S. between an English squadron under Vice-Admiral John Benbow and a French under Admiral Jean du Casse, off Cape Santa Marta on the coast of present-day Colombia, South America, during the War of the Spanish Succession. Benbow vigorously attacked the French squadron, but the refusal of most of his captains to support the action allowed du Casse to escape. Benbow lost a leg during the engagement and died of illness about two months later. Two of the captains were convicted of cowardice and shot.

Benbow's resolution to pursue the French, in what proved to be his last fight, proved irresistible to the public imagination. The events of the fight inspired a number of ballads, usually entitled Admiral Benbow or Brave Benbow, which were still favourites among British sailors more than a century later.

Prelude
Upon the outbreak of the War of the Spanish Succession, Benbow was sent to the West Indies with a small squadron, with the intention of keeping the Spanish possessions there out of the hands of the French. Du Casse was dispatched to Cartagena with a squadron to compel its allegiance to Philip V. Benbow set out to intercept them.

Course of battle
On 19 August 1702, Benbow's squadron encountered the French along the coast of Colombia, off Santa Marta, a little to the east of the mouth of the Rio Magdalena. Commanding from his flagship, the Breda, he ordered his squadron to engage, but Defiance and Windsor being astern and showing no great haste, they had to be ordered to make more sail. Benbow intended to wait for Defiance to come up; but Falmouth opened the engagement by attacking the frigate, and Windsor a ship abreast of her, at four o'clock. Breda joined in, but Defiance and Windsor broke off after a few broadsides and left the Breda under fire from the French, the battle continuing until nightfall. Breda and Ruby pursued the French all night, while the rest of the squadron straggled.

Pursuit continued through the 20th, with the Breda and Ruby firing chase-guns as they could. Engaging again on the morning of the 21st, Ruby was badly damaged; Defiance and Windsor refused action, though abreast of the last French ship. The Greenwich had now fallen five leagues astern. On the 22nd, Breda captured the galley Anne, originally an English ship captured by the French, and the damaged Ruby was ordered to return to Port Royal.

During the night of the 24th, Benbow engaged one of the enemy ships alone and had his right leg wrecked by a chain shot, returning to the quarter-deck as soon as it could be dressed. Flag-Captain Fogg ordered the other captains of the squadron to keep the line of battle; in response, Captain Kirkby of Defiance came aboard and told Benbow, "You had better desist, the French are very strong." Finding the other captains largely of the same opinion, Benbow broke off and returned to Jamaica.

Aftermath
Benbow received a letter from Jean du Casse after the engagement:
Sir,
I had little hopes on Monday last but to have supped in your cabin: but it pleased God to order it otherwise. I am thankful for it. As for those cowardly captains who deserted you, hang them, for by God they deserve it.
Yours,
Du Casse
Such was indeed his course: Benbow held courts-martial upon his captains upon their return. Captains Kirkby and Wade were found guilty of cowardice and sentenced to be shot; Wade was said to have been drunk throughout the engagement. Captain Constable was cleared of the charge of cowardice, but was convicted on other charges and cashiered. Captain Hudson died before he could be tried. Captains Fogg and Vincent were charged with having signed a paper with the other captains of the squadron, stating they would not fight, but they represented this as a device to keep Captain Kirkby from deserting; Benbow testifying in their favour, they were merely suspended.

Benbow's leg was amputated; but a fever developed, and he died on 4 November 1702. Kirkby, Wade, and Constable were sent to Plymouth aboard HMS Bristol, where their sentences were confirmed by the Lord High Admiral. Kirkby and Wade were shot aboard Bristol on 16 April 1703. Fogg and Vincent were permitted to return to the service.

Order of battle

Benbow's squadron
Benbow's squadron consisted of seven ships:
 Breda, 70, Captain Christopher Fogg (flagship)
 Defiance, 64, Captain Richard Kirkby
 Greenwich, 54, Captain Cooper Wade
 Ruby, 48, Captain George Walton
 Pendennis, 48, Captain Thomas Hudson
 Windsor, 60, Captain John Constable
 Falmouth, 48, Captain Samuel Vincent

Du Casse's squadron
 Heureux, 68, Captain Bennet (flagship)
 Agréable, 50, Captain de Roussy
 Phénix, 60, Captain de Poudens
 Apollon, 50, Captain de Demuin
 Prince de Frise, 30, Lieut. de St André
 One fireship, Cauvet
 One transport
 Four sloops

References

Conflicts in 1702
Naval battles of the War of the Spanish Succession
Naval battles involving England
Naval battles involving France
Events that led to courts-martial
1702 in France